The Marion H. Skidmore Library is the largest private library specializing in Spiritualist, New Thought, and psychic research materials and rare books. It serves in-depth researchers at the undergraduate through the doctoral level studies as well as lecturers, academic scholars, and authors. It is supported through tax-deductible contributions, and its work is furthered by the efforts of the Lily Dale Assembly, Inc.

History 
The following words were written in 1899 by William P. Bach, the publisher of the Sunflower, a newspaper published in Lily Dale, New York, from 1898 through 1909.

THE LIBRARY was founded in 1886 and on account of the active interest taken in it by her; it was called the "Marion Skidmore Library." During the fourteen years of its existence it has been continually added to.  The association has continually made appropriations in its behalf, entertainments have been given for its benefit and hundreds of volumes have been donated by friends.  It now comprises between twelve and thirteen hundred bound volumes, besides magazines, papers, etc., not bound.  It has many rare books, including bound volumes of some of the earliest Spiritualist newspapers.  It is located in Library Hall and is always in charge of a competent librarian.

Current information about the Marion H. Skidmore Library 
Two videos are show daily. According to the official webpage, these are:  

The library is currently a non-circulating library open daily from 10 AM to 4 PM.

References

Spiritualism in the United States
Spiritualist organizations
Libraries in New York (state)